William Drogo Montagu, 7th Duke of Manchester KP (Kimbolton Castle, 15 October 1823 – 22 March 1890), known as Lord Kimbolton from 1823 to 1843 and as Viscount Mandeville from 1843 to 1855, was a British peer and Conservative Member of Parliament.

Early life
William Montagu was born at Kimbolton Castle in 1823. He was the eldest son of George Montagu, 6th Duke of Manchester. His mother was Millicent Bernard-Sparrow, daughter of Brig. Gen. Robert Bernard-Sparrow of Brampton Park, Huntingdonshire, and wife the Lady Olivia Acheson (eldest daughter of Arthur Acheson, 1st Earl of Gosford).

Career
He was MP for Bewdley 1848–1852 and Huntingdonshire 1852–1855.

He joined the Canterbury Association on 27 May 1848. It was Edward Gibbon Wakefield's unfulfilled hope that Lord Mandeville would emigrate to New Zealand and be the aristocratic leader in the colony. However Lord Mandeville and his grandmother, Lady Olivia Bernard-Sparrow, did buy  of land between them in Riccarton. Mandeville North near Kaiapoi is named after Lord Mandeville.

He succeeded to the dukedom on the death of his father in 1855, inheriting the family seat of Kimbolton Castle in Huntingdonshire.

Personal life

He had an illegitimate son with Sarah Maria Morris. When Sarah was eight months pregnant, the Montagu family had her married off to Samuel Palmer on 4 March 1850. When the child was born on 10 May 1850, he was named William Edward Palmer. William Edward Palmer married Emma Prentice on 24 December 1873 at Harrold, Bedfordshire.

William was married to Countess Luise Friederike Auguste von Alten in Hanover on 22 July 1852. Together, they had five children: 
 George Victor Drogo Montagu, 8th Duke of Manchester (1853–1892), who married Francisca de la Consolacion Yznaga on 22 May 1876.
 Lady Mary Louisa Elizabeth Montagu (1854–1934), who married William Douglas-Hamilton, 12th Duke of Hamilton on 10 December 1873. She remarried Robert Forster on 20 July 1897.
 Lady Louisa Augusta Beatrice Montagu (1856–1944), who married Archibald Acheson, 4th Earl of Gosford on 10 August 1876. 
 Lord Charles William Augustus Montagu (1860–1939), who married Hon. Mildred Sturt (daughter of Henry Gerard Sturt, 1st Baron Alington) on 4 December 1930.
 Lady Alice Maude Olivia Montagu (1862–1957), who married Edward Stanley, 17th Earl of Derby on 5 January 1889.

In 1877, he was created a Knight of the Order of St Patrick. He was also the Grand Prior of the Order of Saint John (1861-1888), the last one not to be a member of the Royal House. 

He died on 22 March 1890 in Italy at the Hotel Royal, Naples.

References

External links

 

1823 births
1890 deaths
Bailiffs Grand Cross of the Order of St John
William 3
Knights of St Patrick
William Montagu, 07th Duke of Manchester
UK MPs 1847–1852
UK MPs 1852–1857
Manchester, D7
Members of the Canterbury Association
Members of the Parliament of the United Kingdom for constituencies in Huntingdonshire
People from Kimbolton, Cambridgeshire